Ronny Van Geneugden (born 17 August 1968) is a Belgian football coach and former player, currently technical director at MVV Maastricht.

As a manager, Van Geneugden had most of his successes with Oud-Heverlee Leuven, leading them to the Belgian Second Division title in 2010–11, hence gaining promotion to the 1st division for season 2011–12, he was rewarded with a contract extension to 2015. Despite two successful seasons in the 1st division where Oud-Heverlee Leuven finished mid-table, his contract was terminated on 21 January 2014 as his team sat second bottom of the 1st division after a poor first half of the 2013–14 season.

In April 2017, Van Geneugden signed a 2-year-deal in Malawi as the head coach of the national team. The contract expired on 31 March 2019 and on 6 April 2019, the Football Association of Malawi announced that the contract would not be renewed.

Club career
He played for Thor Waterschei, RKC Waalwijk, Antwerp, SK Lommel, Germinal Ekeren, Lokeren and Verbroedering Geel.

References

External links
 Profile & stats - Lokeren
 Ronny Van Geneugden Interview

Living people
Belgian footballers
Belgian football managers
1968 births
Challenger Pro League players
Belgian Pro League players
Eredivisie players
RKC Waalwijk players
Royal Antwerp F.C. players
K.F.C. Lommel S.K. players
Beerschot A.C. players
K.S.C. Lokeren Oost-Vlaanderen players
K.R.C. Genk managers
Oud-Heverlee Leuven managers
Enosis Neon Paralimni FC managers
Sportspeople from Hasselt
Footballers from Limburg (Belgium)
Expatriate football managers in Malawi
Malawi national football team managers
Association football midfielders